William Charles Franklyn Plomer  (10 December 1903 – 20 September 1973) was a South African and British novelist, poet and literary editor. He also wrote a series of librettos for Benjamin Britten. He wrote some of his poetry under the pseudonym Robert Pagan.

Born of British parents in Transvaal Colony, he moved to England in 1929 after spending a few years in Japan. Although not as well known as many of his peers, he is recognised as a modernist and his work was highly esteemed by other writers, including Virginia Woolf and Nadine Gordimer. He was homosexual, and at least one of his novels portrays a gay relationship, but whether he lived as openly gay himself is unclear.

Early life: South Africa
Plomer was born in Pietersburg, in the Transvaal Colony (now Polokwane in the Limpopo Province of South Africa) on 10 December 1903, to Charles Campbell Plomer (d. 1955) and Edythe, daughter of farmer Edward Waite-Browne. His parents were English; his father was a colonial civil servant, formerly apprenticed in the wool trade, and the family moved between England and South Africa several times during Plomer's youth, with Plomer educated mostly in the UK, until his father left the civil service and took over a trading station in the Zululand region, later a recruiting agent for mine workers at Natal, which his son considered a descent in status.
Plomer's great-great-grandfather, Sir William Plomer (1760-1812), was Lord Mayor of London in 1781. Plomer observed in his autobiography of his family: "it is not in the least illustrious, but a bourgeois line of which the fortunes have gone up and down and which has seldom stayed long in one place." The father of his great-uncle by marriage, both men being named William Downing Bruce, published a Plomer genealogy in 1847, claiming "traditionally they derive from a noble Saxon knight, who lived in the time of King Alfred"; Plomer looked disdainfully on this claim, calling it "fiddlesticks", based on nothing more than the fact that "Bruce's son... had married my great-aunt Louisa, and he probably wished to make out that this alliance was as distinguished as it was lucrative- for Louisa was something of an heiress". Lacking interest in "mere names and dates", he much preferred characters like "Christopher Plomer, a canon of Windsor... unfrocked and clapped into the Tower in 1535 for criticizing, as well he might, the behaviour of his royal master, Henry VIII".

Plomer insisted on the pronunciation of his name as "" (to rhyme with "rumour"), although his family pronounced it in the usual way, rhyming with "Homer"; in his autobiography, Plomer addressed his rejection of the usual pronunciation, according to Christopher Heywood's A History of South African Literature (2004), this stemming from embarrassment at his father's occupation, and "hinting an ancestor's improbable job as plumier rather than plumber".

He started writing his first novel, Turbott Wolfe, when he was just 21, which brought him fame (or notoriety) in the Union of South Africa upon publication in 1925, which had inter-racial love and marriage as a theme. He was co-founder, editor and major contributor of the short-lived literary magazine Voorslag ("Whiplash") with two other South African rebels, Roy Campbell and Laurens van der Post in 1926. It included material in both English and Afrikaans, and intended to publish in the Zulu language, and also attempted to portray the more superior standards of European culture, while promoting a racially equal South Africa. Campbell resigned in protest against the editorial control exerted by the financial backer of the magazine. It never gained a wide readership.

1926: Japan
Plomer became a special correspondent for the Natal Witness, but after Van der Post had met and befriended two Japanese men, one being the Japanese captain of a yacht, Katsue Mori, he and Plomer sailed for Japan in September 1926, Plomer leaving South Africa for the last time. Plomer stayed in Japan until March 1929, completing two volumes of short stories (I speak of Africa and Paper Houses) as well as a collection of poetry. He became friends with academic, poet and author Sherard Vines. There he fell in love with a Japanese man, Morito Fukuzawa, who became the model for the title character of Sado.

1929: England

He then travelled through Korea, China, the Soviet Union, Poland, Germany, and Belgium to England and, through his friendship with his publisher Virginia Woolf and husband Leonard Woolf, entered the London literary circles. Among his friends there were Christopher Isherwood, W.H. Auden, Forster, J.R. Ackerley and Stephen Spender. The Woolfs, under their imprint the Hogarth Press, published Sado in 1931 and The Case is Altered in 1932, the latter becoming his most commercially successful novel.

In 1933 Plomer left Hogarth amicably (Selected Poems was published by Hogarth in 1940) and published The Child of Queen Victoria and Other Stories with Jonathan Cape.

He became a literary editor for Faber and Faber, and became chief reader and literary adviser to Jonathan Cape from 1937 to 1940, where he recognised the saleability of, and edited the first and many more of Ian Fleming's James Bond series. Fleming dedicated Goldfinger to Plomer.

From 1937, Plomer took part in BBC radio broadcasts, and contributed to the Aldeburgh Festival from its start in 1948. From the late 1950s, he contributed to frequent poetry readings and events, served on the Arts Council and the board of the Society of Authors.

He is known to have used the pseudonym "Robert Pagan", notably for some of his poetry.

He was also active as a librettist, with Gloriana, Curlew River, The Burning Fiery Furnace and The Prodigal Son for Benjamin Britten.

At least one source (Alexander) says that Plomer was never openly gay during his lifetime; at most he alluded to the subject. However Southworth says that he lived relatively openly as a homosexual in Japan, and portrayed gay relationships in a number of his novels, including Sado, The Case is Altered, and The Invaders.

Later life, death
In later life he collaborated with artist Alan Aldridge on a book of children’s verse, The Butterfly Ball and the Grasshopper’s Feast.

Plomer described himself as "Anglo-African-Asian" in a 1967 article of that name, nearly 40 years after his return to England.

The England and Wales National Probate Calendar records that at the time of his death, his address was 43, Adastra Avenue in Hassocks, West Sussex (Cuckfield Vol 5H, Page 547, 3rd Quarter of 1973); another source gives Lewes, the location of a nearby hospital, as place of death. He died on 20 September 1973 aged 69 in the arms of his partner of almost thirty years, Charles Erdmann. The date given by Encyclopaedia Britannica and in the London Gazette is incorrect.

Recognition, legacy
In 1951 Plomer was elected a fellow of the Royal Society of Literature.

He was awarded an honorary D.Litt. by the University of Durham in 1959.

In 1966 he chaired the panel of judges for the Cholmondeley Award.

He won the Queen's Gold Medal for Poetry in 1963.

He was publicly tipped for the Poet Laureateship in 1967 and 1972.

He was awarded a CBE in 1968.

In 1958 he was elected president of the Poetry Society.

In 1976, the inaugural Mofolo-Plomer Prize, created by Nadine Gordimer and so named in honour of Basotho writer Thomas Mofolo and Plomer, was awarded to Mbulelo Mzamane. The judges for that year were Chinua Achebe, Alan Paton and Adam Small. Since then, Achmat Dangor, J. M. Coetzee, Njabulo Simakahle Ndebele, Rose Zwi and Peter Wilhelm have been other recipients of the prize.

Nadine Gordimer, in her introduction to a new edition of Turbott Wolfe in 2003, said that the novel deserved recognition as being in the "canon of renegade colonialist literature along with Conrad", and others have noted its experimental narrative structure, which puts it (along with some of his other work) in the category of a modernist novel.

His last work, the collection of children's poems entitled The Butterfly Ball and the Grasshopper’s Feast, won the 1973 Whitbread Award.

Durham University has an extensive collection of Plomer's literary papers and correspondence, as well as his library of printed books, and lists a full bibliography on its website.

A portrait of Plomer seated on a chair, in oils, dated 1929, by Edward Wolfe, and several photographs of Plomer, by Howard Coster and others are held by the National Portrait Gallery in London.

Works

 1925. Turbott Wolfe (novel)
 1927. Notes for Poems. Hogarth Press, London (poetry)
 1927. I Speak of Africa (short stories)
 1929. The Family Tree. Hogarth, London (poetry)
 1929. Paper Houses. Hogarth, London (short stories)
 1931. Sado. Hogarth, London (novel)
 1932. The Case is Altered (novel)
 1932. The Fivefold Screen (poetry)
 1933. The Child of Queen Victoria (short stories)
 1933. Cecil Rhodes (biography)
 1934. The Invaders (novel)
 1936. Visiting the Caves. Cape, London (poetry)
 1936. Ali the Lion (biography, reissued in 1970 as The Diamond of Janina)
 1937. William Plomer (editor): Haruko Ichikawa: A Japanese Lady in Europe. Cape, London
 1938. Selections from the Diary of the Rev. Francis Kilvert (1870–1879)
 1940. Selected Poems. Hogarth, London
 1942. In a Bombed House, 1941: Elegy in Memory of Anthony Butts (poetry)
 1943. Double Lives: An Autobiography. Cape, London.
 1945. Curious Relations. Cape, London.  under pseudonym William D'Arfey. Collaboration with Anthony Butts (memoirs of Butts's family)
 1945. The Dorking Thigh and Other Satires (poetry)
 1949. Four Countries. Cape, London (short stories)
 1952. Museum Pieces (novel)
 1955. A Shot in the Park (poetry, published in U.S. as Borderline Ballads)
 1958. At Home: Memoirs. Cape, London.
 1960. Collected Poems. Cape, London.
 1960. A Choice of Ballads (poetry)
 1966. Taste and Remember (poetry)
 1970. Celebrations (poetry)
 1973. Collected Poems. Cape, London (expanded edition)
1973. "Butterfly Ball" Cape, London (Co author with Alan Aldridge)
 1975. The Autobiography of William Plomer. Cape, London (revision of Double Lives, he died before he could rework At Home)
 1978. Electric Delights. Selected and introduced by Rupert Hart-Davis. Cape, London (previously uncollected pieces, including the essay "On Not Answering the Telephone")

References

Citations

Sources

Further reading

External links

 Plomer Collection at Durham University
 "William Plomer and Japan" in Japonisme, Orientalism, Modernism: A Critical Bibliography of Japan in English-Language Verse (themargins.net)
 

1903 births
1973 deaths
20th-century British poets
20th-century British dramatists and playwrights
20th-century South African novelists
Benjamin Britten
British literary editors
British male poets
British opera librettists
Commanders of the Order of the British Empire
British gay writers
British LGBT novelists
South African LGBT novelists
Place of birth missing
Place of death missing
South African male novelists
South African poets
People from Hassocks
People from Polokwane
South African emigrants to the United Kingdom
Presidents of the Poetry Society
British LGBT dramatists and playwrights
British LGBT poets
South African LGBT dramatists and playwrights
South African LGBT poets